Pipton is a small settlement and former civil parish (or community) in Powys, Wales on the Afon Llynfi near its confluence with the River Wye. It was formerly in the county of Brecknockshire and is now part of the community of Bronllys.

The settlement
Prehistoric settlement of the area is evidenced by Pipton Long Cairn, a neolithic burial chamber to the south-west of Pipton Farm.
A fragment of Roman road was found during excavations for the South Wales Gas Pipeline south of the disused railway line, about 450 m west of Pipton Farm. It was not on the orientation of the Y Gaer to Kenchester Roman road which is assumed to have passed near Pipton roughly on the line of the A438. It may have been a spur to this road crossing the Wye and making for Castell Collen.

Pipton Castle
The historic settlement appears to date from the Norman invasion of Wales, when Pipton formed part of the lands of Walter de Clifford. Most villages in the area were fortified and a mound north of the Afon Llynfi has been interpreted as the motte of Pipton Castle. In 1265 the Treaty of Pipton was signed here between Llywelyn ap Gruffudd, Prince of Wales, and Simon de Montfort, 6th Earl of Leicester, on behalf of his royal captive, King Henry III. As part of the treaty,  Henry recognized Llywelyn's lands and title, whilst Llywelyn recognized Henry as his liege lord. Llywelyn had mustered an army at Pipton, which he subsequently sent into England to help de Montfort at the Battle of Evesham. Gruffydd ap Gwenwynwyn, Prince of Powys Wenwynwyn, was one of several other Welsh leaders who were present and attested the treaty.

Manor of Pipton
In the sixteenth century, the manor of Pipton belonged to Walter Devereux, 1st Viscount Hereford and thereafter to his grandson Walter Devereux, 1st Earl of Essex. In the seventeenth and eighteenth centuries it belonged to the Williams family of Old Gwernyfed in nearby Aberllynfi and in the nineteenth century to Thomas Wood of Gwernyfed Park.

Chapel and hamlet
Pipton is in the ecclesiastical parish of Glasbury, St Peters and at one time had its own chapel of ease, long demolished, near Pipton Bridge.  Sir Walter Vaughan Morgan, sometime Lord Mayor of London, was born in Pipton in 1831. His brother, Octavius Vaughan Morgan, Liberal member of parliament for Battersea 1888–1892, was born there in 1837.

In 1831, Pipton was described as a hamlet with a population of 125. This presumably refers to the civil parish, however, since the settlement of Pipton itself now consists of little more than a bridge, a farm, and a single house and, based on archaeological evidence, may never have been much larger.

The parish and community
Pipton was a civil parish between 1837 and 1974, when it was retermed a community. The parish included the settlement of Pipton and extended northwards towards Llyswen, where it included the house and lands of Y Dderw, and westwards towards Bronllys, where it included the farms of Pentre-Sollars and Porth-y-morddwr. The population of the parish declined from 105 in 1881 to 54 in 1961. In 1985, the community of Pipton was merged with the community of Bronllys.

Y Dderw

Y Dderw, within the former community, is a large 16th-century house. It was owned by the Morgan family in the 17th and 18th century. William Morgan of Y Dderw was the King's Attorney for South Wales (1639–49) and MP for Brecknock (1640–49). Charles Morgan was MP for the borough of Brecon (1763–69) and for Brecknock (1769–87). John Morgan was MP for the borough of Brecon (1769–71). It is now a grade II* listed building.

References

Villages in Powys